Colonel Roderick Kendrick Barnes (23 August 1935 – 19 February 2009) was an officer in the Jamaica Defence Force, a sports administrator, and the father of footballer John Barnes. Ken Barnes represented Jamaica in football in the 1950s.

References

1935 births
2009 deaths
Trinidad and Tobago emigrants to Jamaica
Jamaican military officers
Jamaican footballers
Jamaica international footballers
Association footballers not categorized by position